The United States competed at the 2013 Summer Universiade in Kazan, Russia.

Medalists

Athletics

The United States will be represented in athletics.

Men
Track & road events

Field events

Women
Track & road events

Field events

Badminton

The United States will be represented by two male and two female badminton players.

Men

Women

Mixed

Basketball

The United States has qualified both a men's and a women's team.

Men
The men's team will participate in Group C.

Team roster
The men's team roster is as follows:

|}
| valign="top" |
 Head coach
  (Davidson College)
 Assistant coach(es)
  (University of Michigan)
  (University of South Carolina)
 Team Physician
  (Duke University)
 Athletic Trainer
  (Davidson College)

Legend
 (C) Team captain
 nat field describes country of university
 Age field is age on July 7, 2013
|}

Preliminary round

|}

Classification round

Final rank: 9

Women
The women's team will participate in Group B.

Team roster
The women's team roster is as follows:

|}
| valign="top" |
 Head coach
  (University of Oklahoma)
 Assistant coach(es)
  (Marist College)
  (Penn State University)
 Athletic Trainer
  (Michigan State University)

Legend
 (C) Team captain
 nat field describes country of university
 Age field is age on July 7, 2013
|}

Preliminary round

|}

Quarterfinals

Semifinals

Gold Medal Game

Final rank:

Beach volleyball

The United States will be represented by two men's teams and two women's teams.

Men

Women

Diving

The United States will be represented by twelve divers from ten universities.

Men

Women

Fencing

The United States was represented in fencing.

Men

Women

Judo

The United States will be represented by three judoka.

Men

Repechage rounds

*Nick Delpopolo was due to compete, but withdrew from the tournament due to illness.

Rowing

The United States will be represented by an eight crew.

Men

Rugby sevens

The United States will be represented by a women's team.

Women
The women's team will participate in Group B.

Team roster
The team roster is as follows:

Head coach: Sue ParkerAssistant coach: Jenny HansenTeam manager: Julie HoganAthletic trainer: Meghan Chambers

Preliminary round

Classification round

Final rank: 10

Sambo

The United States will be represented by one practitioner.

Men

Shooting

The United States will be represented in the shooting competitions. Over half of the pistol team and the coach of the pistol team will be from the United States Military Academy.

Men

Women

Swimming

The United States will be represented by a team of swimmers from colleges across the nation.

Men

Women

Synchronized swimming

The United States will be represented by eleven synchronized swimmers, most of whom are from Stanford University, the national collegiate champions of synchronized swimming.

Tennis

The United States will be represented by the University of Southern California tennis team, which will consist of four male and four female tennis players.

Men

Consolation Draw

Women

Consolation Draw

Mixed

Volleyball

The United States has qualified both a men's and a women's team.

Men
The men's team will participate in Group A.

Team roster
In the men's tournament, the United States will be represented by the Springfield College of Massachusetts volleyball team. The roster is listed as follows:

Head coach: Charlie SullivanAssistant coaches: Kevin Burch, Tyler Wingate, Sam Zapatka

Preliminary round

|}

Classification round

Final rank: 19

Women
The women's team will participate in Group A.

Team roster
In the women's tournament, the United States will be represented by the Kansas State University volleyball team. The roster is listed as follows:

Head coach: Suzie FritzAssociate head coach: Jeff GroveAssistant coach: Jeff Hulsmeyer

Preliminary round

|}

Classification round

Final rank: 14

Water polo

The United States has qualified both a men's team and a women's team.

Men
The men's team will participate in Group B.

Team roster
In the men's tournament, the United States will be represented by the University of California, Los Angeles water polo team. The roster is listed as follows:

Head coach: Adam WrightAssistant coach: Layne BeaubienManager: Myles Cooper

Preliminary round

Quarterfinals

Classification round

Final rank: 5

Women
The women's team will participate in Group B.

Team roster
In the women's tournament, the United States will be represented by the University of California, Berkeley water polo team. The roster is listed as follows:

Head coach: Richard CorsoAssociate head coach: Matt Flesher

Preliminary round

Quarterfinals

Classification round

Final rank: 8

Weightlifting

The United States will be represented by seven male and seven female weightlifters.

Men

Women

Wrestling

The United States will be represented in each weight category by twenty-one wrestlers.

Men
Greco-Roman

Freestyle

Women
Freestyle

References

2013 in American sports
2013
Nations at the 2013 Summer Universiade